Carlos Federico López Restrepo (born 1975) is a Colombian-American scientist who researches network-driven biological processes using computational tools. Until March 2022, López was a tenured Associate Professor of Biochemistry & Pharmacology & Biomedical Informatics & Mechanical Engineering at Vanderbilt University. He is currently a Principal Scientist and the Multiscale Modeling Lead at Altos Labs.

Early life and education 
López was born in Bogotá, Colombia. He graduated from Colegio San Carlos, a primary and secondary private Catholic school in Bogotá.

López graduated from University of Miami with a B.Sc. in Chemistry and Biochemistry, and a B.L.A. in Liberal Arts in 1998. In 2004 he obtained a Ph.D. in Physical Chemistry under the supervision of Michael L. Klein in the University of Pennsylvania. He was also postdoctoral fellow in chemistry at the Center for Computational Molecular Sciences of the University of Texas at Austin and research fellow in systems biology at the Harvard Medical School.

Career 
López lead a namesake laboratory in Vanderbilt University in the department of biochemistry with the goal of “developing and applying numerical, modeling, and statistical methods to understand cellular processes and their dysregulation.” 

Under his 2019 National Science Foundation CAREER award López investigated the underpinnings for essential biochemical processes. In 2017 he was named Vanderbilt’s liaison to Oak Ridge National Laboratory.

López has published more than forty papers and has done numerous presentations in academic and scientific conferences. His work has been cited in thousands of publications.

In 2021 López was promoted to the rank of Associate Professor (with tenure) at Vanderbilt University. In 2022, López moved to Altos Laboratories to study cellular processes associated with aging.

Software development 
The López lab has contributed to various software tools used in systems biology including:

 PySB a modeling framework to encode cellular biochemical processes in Python. 
 PyDREAM a Python implementation of the DREAM algorithm for Bayesian parameter inference.
 MAGINE a modeling framework for multi-omics data integration. 
 PyViPR a visualization tool for dynamic biochemical processes with automated network resolution representation. 

All tools from the Lopez lab can be found at the Lopez lab website on GitHub.

References

External links 

 
 Carlos F. López in PubMed.gov

Colombian scientists
People from Bogotá
Vanderbilt University faculty
University of Miami alumni
University of Pennsylvania alumni
University of Texas at Austin alumni
Harvard Medical School faculty
Colegio San Carlos alumni
1975 births
Living people